The 1968 Championship of Australia was the 12th edition of the Championship of Australia, an ANFC-organised national club Australian rules football match between the champion clubs from the VFL and the SANFL.

This was the first Championship of Australia match to be held since 1914.

Qualified Teams

Venue
 Adelaide Oval (Capacity: 64,000)

Match details

Championship of Australia 

Championship of Australia
1968 in Australian rules football
October 1968 sports events in Australia